Male expendability, male disposability, the relative expendability argument, or the expendable male hypothesis is the idea that human male lives are of less concern to a population than female lives. It comes from the idea that, from a reproductivity standpoint, one male may be able to impregnate or otherwise father offspring with many females. In humans, this would mean that a population with many reproducing women and few reproducing men would be able to grow more easily than a population with many reproducing men and few reproducing women. Anthropologists have used the concept of male expendibility in their research since the 1970s to study such things as polygyny and matrilinearity. Men's rights advocates have adopted the concept to explain and defend their own views of society.

Overview 
The idea of male expendability in humans stems from the assumption that the biological differences in the roles of the sexes in procreation translate into societal differences in value placed on men and women. In human reproduction, it requires far less time and energy for a man to produce sperm and semen and complete sexual intercourse than for a woman to complete pregnancy and childbirth. Male expendability takes the idea that one or a few men could therefore father children with many women such that a given population could still grow if it had many child-bearing women and only a few men but not the other way around.

Anthropologists have used the idea of male expendability to study such subjects as polygyny, matrilineality, and division of labor by gender.

Men's rights advocates have used male expendability to explain how, in their view, society can be unfair and harmful towards men. For example, Warren Farrell, a founding figure of the men's rights movement, has defined male expendability as society's willingness to sacrifice the health, wellbeing, and lives of males to serve its interests and keep itself safe from outside predation and attack. In this model of male expendability, the patriarchal cognitive frame assigns the role of sex object to women and assigns to men the role of violence object, with male expendability being corollary to the sexual objectification of women. This form of male expendability includes the social expectation that men will step in to defend others from danger, work the most dangerous jobs, and risk death or serious injury by doing so.

Some versions of male expendability also rely on the assumption that men are generally stronger and able to run faster and throw farther than women. This form of the male expendability model maintains that these physical differences along with reproductive differences have permeated most human societies such that the males are expected to protect the females. According to Farrell,  male disposability has also been romanticised as chivalry, which he says is term which promotes male "servitude and disposability" by rewarding males who engage in public acts of heroism with statues and glory as a form of social bribe. Farrell says that this expectation causes society to train young boys and men with a 'hero' mindset, ultimately priming them to register for the draft or armed service, volunteer as fire fighters, and to perform nearly all of the most dangerous and hazardous jobs. As an example, Farrell cites the military conscription of young men during conflicts to fight and possibly be injured or die.

Theory and concept
According to Carol Mukhopadhyay and Patricia Higgins, the concept of male expendability was first written down by fellow anthropologist Ernestine Friedl in 1975, calling it the "relative expendability argument." Anthropologists note that "most societies in the ethnographic record" allow polygyny, in which a man may have more than one female partner but a woman many not have more than one male partner. Per the male expendability model, it therefore makes sense for societies to assign the most dangerous jobs to men rather than to women.

Ivana Milojević argues that while patriarchy assigns the role of sex object to women, it assigns to men the role of violence object, with male expendability being corollary to the sexual objectification of women. Social psychologist Roy Baumeister argues that it is common for cultures to thrive by exploiting males; this includes the most dangerous jobs being male dominated and job related deaths being higher in those occupations. This includes men making up the large majority of occupations such as construction workers, truck drivers, police, fire fighters, and armed service members.

In an article on men of the Manosphere, religion writer Jeff Sharlet notes: "poor and working class men are cannon fodder abroad and expendable labor at home, trapped beneath a glass floor in jobs nobody really wants—farm workers, roofers, garbage men—and injured at far higher rates than women ..." Anarcho-capitalist economist Walter Block argues in The Case for Discrimination that male expendability is the result of women being the bottleneck of reproductive capacity in a population, a theme that was also presented in Warren Farrell's The Myth of Male Power.

Examples 

The concept of "Women and children first", otherwise known as the "Birkenhead Drill", is a code of conduct that originated during the 19th century Victorian era, where men are sent to slow down the sinking of a ship while women and children escape. In the 19th and 20th centuries, "women and children first" was seen as a chivalric ideal. However, the drill was only rarely used in practice.

One 2016 experiment suggested that people are more likely to agree to sacrificing a man or a person of unspecified gender than a woman in the interest of saving the lives of others or pursuing the interests of human society.

Norwegian sociologist and scholar of men's studies Øystein Gullvåg Holter argues that the male-led Russian government's belief in male expendability contributed to their delay in seeking international help during the Kursk submarine disaster, in which an all-male crew of 118 personnel was lost. He states, "If 118 women had been killed, alarm bells regarding discrimination against women would probably have gone off around the world." He states that able-bodied males were viewed as a more legitimate target during wars in Bosnia, Kosovo, Timor, Rwanda, and Chechnya.

See also 
 Androcide
 Bateman's principle
Economy-of-effort theory
Strength theory
 Misandry
 Lost boys (Mormon fundamentalism)
 Missing white woman syndrome
 Reverse sexism

References

External links
 
 

Gender-related violence
Gender equality
Men's health
Men's rights
Violence against men
Misandry